Phytolacca dioica, commonly known as ombú, is a massive evergreen tree native to the Pampa of South America. As its specific epithet suggests, it is dioecious, with male and female flowers on separate plants. The flowers are pollinated by the butterfly Doxocopa laurentia. It has an umbrella-like canopy that spreads to a diameter of 12 to 15 meters (40 to 50 feet) and can attain a height of 12 to 18 meters (40 to 60 feet). Because it is derived from herbaceous ancestors, its trunk consists of anomalous secondary thickening rather than true wood. As a result, the ombú grows fast but its wood is soft and spongy enough to be cut with a knife. These properties have led it to be used in the art of bonsai, as it is easily manipulated to create the desired effect.  Since the sap is poisonous, the ombú is not grazed by cattle and is immune to locusts and other pests. For similar reasons, the leaves are sometimes used as a laxative or purgative. It is a symbol of Uruguay and Argentina, and of gaucho culture, as its canopy is quite distinguishable from afar and provides comfort and shelter from sun and rain.

This tree is categorized in the same genus as the North American pokeweed. The species is also cultivated in Southern California as a shade tree. Ombú has been declared as a minor invasive species (category 3) in South Africa, where it is widely planted.

Gallery

References

dioica
Trees of Argentina
Trees of Uruguay
Dioecious plants